Charles Patrick Neale (January 21, 1921 – February 9, 1990) was a Canadian politician, who represented the electoral district of Vancouver East in the House of Commons of Canada from 1972 to 1974. He was a member of the New Democratic Party.

Neale died at Vancouver on February 9, 1990, of complications of heart disease and chronic obstructive pulmonary disease.

References

1921 births
1990 deaths
Members of the House of Commons of Canada from British Columbia
New Democratic Party MPs
Politicians from Hamilton, Ontario